

Winners and nominees

1990s

2000s

2010s

Records 
 Most awarded actress: Carmen Salinas, 2 times.
 Most nominated actress: Carmen Salinas with 5 nominations.
 Most nominated actress without a win: Tiaré Scanda with 3 nominations.
 Youngest winner: Julia Urbini, 21 years old.
 Youngest nominee: Nora Salinas, 24 years old.
 Oldest winner: Raquel Olmedo, 75 years old.
 Oldest nominee: Carmen Salinas, 69 years old.
 Actress winning after long time: Carmen Salinas by (María Mercedes, 1993) and (Preciosa, 1999), 6 years difference.
 Actresses was nominated in this category, despite having played as a main villain:
Alma Delfina (Pueblo chico, infierno grande, 1998)
Chantal Andere (La usurpadora, 1999)
Nora Salinas (Rosalinda, 2000)
 Elizabeth Álvarez (La fea más bella, 2007)
Laura Carmine (Amor bravío, 2013)
 Jessica Coch (Amor de barrio, 2015)
Foreign winning actress:
Martha Roth from Italy
 Niurka Marcos from Cuba
Mariana Karr from Argentina
 Raquel Olmedo from Cuba

References

External links 
TVyNovelas at esmas.com
TVyNovelas Awards at the univision.com

Supporting Actress
Awards established in 1993
Awards disestablished in 2018
Television awards for Best Supporting Actress